Microdiniaceae is a family of dinofagellates in the order Gonyaulacales.

References 

 Emendation and transfer of Eisenackia (Pyrrhophyta) from the Microdiniaceae to the Gonyaulacaceae. DM McLean, Geologiska Föreningen i Stockholm Förhandlingar, 1973
 Fossil and Living Dinoflagellates. W. A. S. Sarjeant

External links 

Dinoflagellate families
Gonyaulacales